Cavalier Johnson (born ) is an American politician and mayor of Milwaukee, Wisconsin. He recently served as Milwaukee Common Council president as well as Milwaukee's 2nd District alderman. In April 2022, Johnson won a special election, becoming the first African American elected mayor of Milwaukee; he is the second African American mayor to serve.

Early life and education 
Johnson's father worked as a janitor for more than 30 years and his mother worked as a certified nursing assistant. He is one of 10 siblings. He grew up in Milwaukee's 53206 ZIP code, known for having the highest incarceration rate of African American males out of any ZIP code in the country.

At 14 years old, he was selected by the YMCA to participate in a pre-college program, Sponsor-A-Scholar, for low-income students in Milwaukee Public Schools. Johnson credits this for his commitment to community service.

In 2005, Johnson graduated from Bay View High School. As a junior, he was a cameraman for the Youth in Government press corps.

In 2009, Johnson graduated with a B.A. in political science from the University of Wisconsin–Madison.

Johnson has served on boards at the Milwaukee YMCA, ACLU of Wisconsin, and Milwaukee Community Brainstorming.

Career 
After college, Johnson worked with the Milwaukee Area Workforce Investment Board assisting at-risk youth, youth entering the workforce for the first time, and adults retooling to enter the workforce. Johnson worked as a community outreach liaison for the government of Milwaukee where he interacted with community and faith leaders.

Johnson ran for a seat on the Milwaukee County Board of Supervisors in a five-way special election in 2011. He finished fifth with 171 votes. In 2012, Johnson ran for a different seat on the County Board, finishing sixth out of seven candidates with 106 votes.

In 2016, Johnson ran for 2nd District Alderman on the Milwaukee Common Council, winning a five-way primary with 38 percent of the vote and winning the general election with 4,307 votes (52 percent). In 2018, Johnson was the lead sponsor to ban fee-based conversion therapy of minors in Milwaukee.

Johnson was re-elected without opposition in 2020 and was also elected by his peers in a 8–7 vote to serve as the Milwaukee Common Council President. 

Johnson became acting mayor of Milwaukee upon the resignation of Tom Barrett to assume the ambassadorship of Luxembourg, on December 22, 2021. He served as acting mayor until the 2022 Milwaukee mayoral special election, a race in which Johnson was a candidate. The day before assuming the role, Johnson announced his top priority would be combating reckless driving to create safe streets. On April 5, 2022, Johnson won the special election, becoming the first elected African-American mayor of Milwaukee. Johnson is also the first elected Black mayor of Milwaukee and second Black mayor after Marvin Pratt served as acting mayor in 2004.

Personal life 
Johnson lives in Milwaukee's Capitol Heights neighborhood. He is married and has three children.

Electoral history 

| colspan="6" style="text-align:center;background-color: #e9e9e9;"| Nonpartisan Special Primary, February 15, 2022

| colspan="6" style="text-align:center;background-color: #e9e9e9;"| Special Election, April 5, 2022

References

External links 
 

1980s births
21st-century American politicians
African-American mayors in Wisconsin
Living people
Mayors of Milwaukee
Milwaukee Common Council members
Place of birth missing (living people)
University of Wisconsin–Madison alumni
Wisconsin Democrats
Year of birth uncertain